This is a list of programmers notable for their contributions to software, either as original author or architect, or for later additions. All entries must already have associated articles.

A

Michael Abrash – program optimization and x86 assembly language
Scott Adams – series of text adventures beginning in the late 1970s
Tarn Adams – Dwarf Fortress
Leonard Adleman – co-created RSA algorithm (being the A in that name), coined the term computer virus
Alfred Aho – co-created AWK (being the A in that name), and main author of famous Compilers: Principles, Techniques, and Tools (Dragon book)
Andrei Alexandrescu – author, expert on languages C++, D
Paul Allen – Altair BASIC, Applesoft BASIC, cofounded Microsoft
Eric Allman – sendmail, syslog
Marc Andreessen – co-created Mosaic, cofounded Netscape
Jeremy Ashkenas – CoffeeScript programming language and Backbone.js
Bill Atkinson – QuickDraw, HyperCard

B

Roland Carl Backhouse – computer program construction, algorithmic problem solving, ALGOL
John Backus – Fortran, BNF
Lars Bak – virtual machine specialist
Richard Bartle – MUD, with Roy Trubshaw, created MUDs
Friedrich L. Bauer – Stack (data structure), Sequential Formula Translation, ALGOL, software engineering, Bauer–Fike theorem
Kent Beck – created Extreme programming, cocreated JUnit
Donald Becker – Linux Ethernet drivers, Beowulf clustering
Brian Behlendorf – Apache HTTP Server
Doug Bell – Dungeon Master series of video games
Fabrice Bellard – created FFmpeg open codec library, QEMU virtualization tools
Tim Berners-Lee – invented World Wide Web
Daniel J. Bernstein – djbdns, qmail
Eric Bina – cocreated Mosaic web browser
Marc Blank – cocreated Zork
Joshua Bloch – core Java language designer, lead the Java collections framework project
Jonathan Blow –  video games Braid and The Witness
Susan G. Bond – cocreated ALGOL 68-R
Grady Booch – cocreated Unified Modeling Language
Bert Bos – authored Argo web browser, co-authored Cascading Style Sheets
Stephen R. Bourne – cocreated ALGOL 68C, created Bourne shell
David Bradley – coder on the IBM PC project team who wrote the Control-Alt-Delete keyboard handler, embedded in all PC-compatible BIOSes
Andrew Braybrook – video games Paradroid and Uridium
Larry Breed – implementation of Iverson Notation (APL), co-developed APL\360, Scientific Time Sharing Corporation cofounder
Jack Elton Bresenham – created Bresenham's line algorithm
Dan Bricklin – cocreated VisiCalc, the first personal spreadsheet program
Walter Bright – Digital Mars, First C++ compiler, authored D (programming language)
Sergey Brin – cofounded Google Inc.
Per Brinch Hansen (surname "Brinch Hansen") – RC 4000 multiprogramming system, operating system kernels, microkernels, monitors, concurrent programming, Concurrent Pascal, distributed computing & processes, parallel computing
Richard Brodie – Microsoft Word
Andries Brouwer – Hack, former maintainer of man pager, Linux kernel hacker
Danielle Bunten Berry (Dani Bunten) – M.U.L.E., multiplayer video game and other noted video games
Dries Buytaert – created Drupal

C

Steve Capps – cocreated Macintosh and Newton
John Carmack – first-person shooters Doom, Quake
Vint Cerf – TCP/IP, NCP
Ward Christensen – wrote the first BBS (Bulletin Board System) system CBBS
Edgar F. Codd – principal architect of relational model
Bram Cohen – BitTorrent protocol design and implementation
Alain Colmerauer – Prolog
Richard W. Conway – compilers for CORC, CUPL, and PL/C; XCELL Factory Modelling System
Alan Cooper – Visual Basic
Mike Cowlishaw – REXX and NetRexx, LEXX editor, image processing, decimal arithmetic packages
Alan Cox – co-developed Linux kernel
Brad Cox – Objective-C
Mark Crispin – created IMAP, authored UW-IMAP, one of reference implementations of IMAP4
William Crowther – Colossal Cave Adventure
Ward Cunningham – created Wiki concept
Dave Cutler – architected RSX-11M, OpenVMS, VAXELN, DEC MICA, Windows NT

D

Ole-Johan Dahl – cocreated Simula, object-oriented programming
Ryan Dahl – created Node.js
James Duncan Davidson – created Tomcat, now part of Jakarta Project
Terry A. Davis – developer of TempleOS
Jeff Dean – Spanner, Bigtable, MapReduce
L. Peter Deutsch – Ghostscript, Assembler for PDP-1, XDS-940 timesharing system, QED original co-author
Robert Dewar – IFIP WG 2.1 member, chairperson, ALGOL 68; AdaCore cofounder, president, CEO
Edsger W. Dijkstra – contributions to ALGOL, Dijkstra's algorithm, Go To Statement Considered Harmful, IFIP WG 2.1 member
Matt Dillon – programmed various software including DICE and DragonflyBSD
Jack Dorsey – created Twitter
Martin Dougiamas – creator and lead developed Moodle
Adam Dunkels – authored Contiki operating system, the lwIP and uIP embedded TCP/IP stacks, invented protothreads

E

Les Earnest – authored finger program
Alan Edelman – Edelman's Law, stochastic operator, Interactive Supercomputing, Julia (programming language) cocreator, high performance computing, numerical computing
Brendan Eich – created JavaScript
Larry Ellison – co-created Oracle Database, cofounded Oracle Corporation
Andrey Ershov – languages ALPHA, Rapira; first Soviet time-sharing system AIST-0, electronic publishing system RUBIN, multiprocessing workstation MRAMOR, IFIP WG 2.1 member, Aesthetics and the Human Factor in Programming
Marc Ewing – created Red Hat Linux

F

Scott Fahlman – created smiley face emoticon :-) 
Dan Farmer – created COPS and Security Administrator Tool for Analyzing Networks (SATAN) Security Scanners
Steve Fawkner – created Warlords and Puzzle Quest
Stuart Feldman – created make, authored Fortran 77 compiler, part of original group that created Unix
David Filo – cocreated Yahoo!
Brad Fitzpatrick – created memcached, Livejournal and OpenID
Andrew Fluegelman – author PC-Talk communications software; considered a cocreated shareware
Mahmoud Samir Fayed – created PWCT and Ring
Martin Fowler – created the dependency injection pattern of software engineering, a form of inversion of control
Brian Fox – created Bash, Readline, GNU Finger

G

Elon Gasper – cofounded Bright Star Technology, patented realistic facial movements for in-game speech; HyperAnimator, Alphabet Blocks, etc.
Bill Gates – Altair BASIC, cofounded Microsoft
Nick Gerakines – author, contributor to open-source Erlang projects
Jim Gettys – X Window System, HTTP/1.1, One Laptop per Child, Bufferbloat
Steve Gibson – created SpinRite
John Gilmore – GNU Debugger (GDB)
Adele Goldberg – cocreated Smalltalk
Robert Griesemer – cocreated Go
Ryan C. Gordon (a.k.a. Icculus) – Lokigames, ioquake3
James Gosling – Java, Gosling Emacs, NeWS
Bill Gosper – Macsyma, Lisp machine, hashlife, helped Donald Knuth on Vol.2 of The Art of Computer Programming (Semi-numerical algorithms)
Paul Graham – Yahoo! Store, On Lisp, ANSI Common Lisp
John Graham-Cumming – authored POPFile, a Bayesian filter-based e-mail classifier
David Gries – The book The Science of Programming,  Interference freedom, Member Emeritus, IFIP Working Group 2.3 on Programming Methodology
Ralph Griswold – cocreated SNOBOL, created Icon (programming language)
Richard Greenblatt – Lisp machine, Incompatible Timesharing System, MacHack
Neil J. Gunther – authored Pretty Damn Quick (PDQ) performance modeling program
Scott Guthrie (a.k.a. ScottGu) – ASP.NET creator
Jürg Gutknecht – with Niklaus Wirth: Lilith computer; Modula-2, Oberon, Zonnon programming languages; Oberon operating system
Andi Gutmans – cocreated PHP programming language
Michael Guy – Phoenix, work on number theory, computer algebra, higher dimension polyhedra theory, ALGOL 68C; work with John Horton Conway

H

Daniel Ha – cofounder and CEO of blog comment platform Disqus
Nico Habermann – work on operating systems, software engineering, inter-process communication, process synchronization, deadlock avoidance, software verification, programming languages: ALGOL 60, BLISS, Pascal, Ada
Jim Hall – started the FreeDOS project
Margaret Hamilton – Director of Software Engineering Division of MIT Instrumentation Laboratory, which developed on-board flight software for the space Apollo program
Eric Hehner – predicative programming, formal methods, quote notation, ALGOL
David Heinemeier Hansson – created the Ruby on Rails framework for developing web applications
Rebecca Heineman – authored Bard's Tale III: Thief of Fate and Dragon Wars
Gernot Heiser – operating system teaching, research, commercialising, Open Kernel Labs, OKL4, Wombat
Anders Hejlsberg – Turbo Pascal, Borland Delphi, C#, TypeScript
Ted Henter – founded Henter-Joyce (now part of Freedom Scientific) created JAWS screen reader software for blind people
Andy Hertzfeld – co-created Macintosh, cofounded General Magic, cofounded Eazel
D. Richard Hipp – created SQLite
C. A. R. Hoare – first implementation of quicksort, ALGOL 60 compiler, Communicating sequential processes
Louis Hodes – Lisp, pattern recognition, logic programming, cancer research
Grace Hopper – Harvard Mark I computer, FLOW-MATIC, COBOL
David A. Huffman – created the Huffman coding; a compression algorithm
Roger Hui – created J
Dave Hyatt – co-authored Mozilla Firefox
P. J. Hyett – cofounded GitHub

I

Miguel de Icaza – GNOME project leader, initiated Mono project
Roberto Ierusalimschy – Lua leading architect
Dan Ingalls – cocreated Smalltalk and Bitblt
Geir Ivarsøy – cocreated Opera web browser
Ken Iverson – APL, J
Toru Iwatani – created Pac-Man

J

Bo Jangeborg – ZX Spectrum games
Paul Jardetzky – authored server program for the first webcam
Stephen C. Johnson – yacc
Lynne Jolitz – 386BSD
William Jolitz – 386BSD
Bill Joy – BSD, csh, vi, cofounded Sun Microsystems
Robert K. Jung – created ARJ

K

Poul-Henning Kamp – MD5 password hash algorithm, FreeBSD GEOM and GBDE, part of UFS2, FreeBSD Jails, malloc and the Beerware license
Mitch Kapor – Lotus 1-2-3, founded Lotus Development Corporation
Phil Katz – created Zip (file format), authored PKZIP
Ted Kaehler – contributions to Smalltalk, Squeak, HyperCard
Alan Kay – Smalltalk, Dynabook, Object-oriented programming, Squeak
Mel Kaye – LGP-30 and RPC-4000 machine code programmer at Royal McBee in the 1950s, famed as "Real Programmer" in the Story of Mel
Stan Kelly-Bootle – Manchester Mark 1, The Devil's DP Dictionary
John Kemeny – cocreated BASIC
Brian Kernighan – cocreated AWK (being the K in that name), authored ditroff text-formatting tool
Gary Kildall – CP/M, MP/M, BIOS, PL/M, also known for work on data-flow analysis, binary recompilers, multitasking operating systems, graphical user interfaces, disk caching, CD-ROM file system and data structures, early multi-media technologies, founded Digital Research (DRI)
Tom Knight – Incompatible Timesharing System
Jim Knopf – a.k.a. Jim Button, author PC-File flatfile database; cocreated shareware
Donald E. Knuth – TeX, CWEB, Metafont, The Art of Computer Programming, Concrete Mathematics
Andrew R. Koenig – co-authored books on C and C++ and former Project Editor of ISO/ANSI standards committee for C++
Cornelis H. A. Koster – Report on the Algorithmic Language ALGOL 68, ALGOL 68 transput

L

Andre LaMothe – created XGameStation, one of world's first video game console development kits
Leslie Lamport – LaTeX
Butler Lampson – QED original co-author
Peter Landin – ISWIM, J operator, SECD machine, off-side rule, syntactic sugar, ALGOL, IFIP WG 2.1 member
Tom Lane – main author of libjpeg, major developer of PostgreSQL
Sam Lantinga – created Simple DirectMedia Layer (SDL)
Dick Lathwell – codeveloped APL\360
Chris Lattner – main author of LLVM project
Samuel J. Leffler – BSD, FlexFAX, LibTIFF, FreeBSD Wireless Device Drivers
Rasmus Lerdorf – original created PHP
Michael Lesk – Lex
Gordon Letwin – architected OS/2, authored High Performance File System (HPFS)
Jochen Liedtke – microkernel operating systems Eumel, L3, L4
Charles H. Lindsey – IFIP WG 2.1 member, Revised Report on ALGOL 68
Håkon Wium Lie – co-authored Cascading Style Sheets
Yanhong Annie Liu – programming languages, algorithms, program design, program optimization, software systems, optimizing, analysis, and transformations, intelligent systems, distributed computing, computer security, IFIP WG 2.1 member
Robert Love – Linux kernel developer
Ada Lovelace – first programmer (of Charles Babbages' Analytical Engine)
Al Lowe – created Leisure Suit Larry series
David Luckham – Lisp, Automated theorem proving, Stanford Pascal Verifier, Complex event processing, Rational Software cofounder (Ada compiler)
Hans Peter Luhn – hash-coding, linked list, searching and sorting binary tree

M

Khaled Mardam-Bey – created mIRC (Internet Relay Chat Client)
Robert C. Martin – authored Clean Code, The Clean Coder, leader of Clean Code movement, signatory on the Agile Manifesto
John Mashey – authored PWB shell, also called Mashey shell
Yukihiro Matsumoto – Ruby
John McCarthy – Lisp, ALGOL, IFIP WG 2.1 member, artificial intelligence
Craig McClanahan – original author Jakarta Struts, architect of Tomcat Catalina servlet container
Daniel D. McCracken – professor at City College and authored Guide to Algol Programming, Guide to Cobol Programming, Guide to Fortran Programming (1957)
Scott A. McGregor – architect and development team lead of Microsoft Windows 1.0, co-authored X Window System version 11, and developed Cedar Viewers Windows System at Xerox PARC
Douglas McIlroy – macros, pipes and filters, concept of software componentry, Unix tools (spell, diff, sort, join, graph, speak, tr, etc.)
Marshall Kirk McKusick – Berkeley Software Distribution (BSD), work on FFS, implemented soft updates
Sid Meier – author, Civilization and Railroad Tycoon, cofounded MicroProse
Bertrand Meyer – Eiffel, Object-oriented Software Construction, design by contract
Bob Miner – co-created Oracle Database, cofounded Oracle Corporation
Jeff Minter – psychedelic, and often llama-related video games
James G. Mitchell – WATFOR compiler, Mesa (programming language), Spring (operating system), ARM architecture
Arvind Mithal – formal verification of large digital systems, developing dynamic dataflow architectures, parallel computing programming languages (Id, pH), compiling on parallel machines
Petr Mitrichev – competitive programmer
Cleve Moler – co-authored LINPACK, EISPACK, and MATLAB 
Lou Montulli – created Lynx browser, cookies, the blink tag, server push and client pull, HTTP proxying, HTTP over SSL, browser integration with animated GIFs, founding member of HTML working group at W3C
Bram Moolenaar – authored text-editor Vim
David A. Moon – Maclisp, ZetaLisp
Charles H. Moore – created Forth language
Roger Moore – co-developed APL\360, created IPSANET, cofounded I. P. Sharp Associates
Matt Mullenweg – authored WordPress
Boyd Munro – Australian developed GRASP, owns SDI, one of earliest software development companies
Mike Muuss – authored ping, network tool to detect hosts

N

Patrick Naughton – early Java designer, HotJava
Peter Naur (1928–2016) – Backus–Naur form (BNF), ALGOL 60, IFIP WG 2.1 member
Fredrik Neij – cocreated The Pirate Bay
Graham Nelson – created Inform authoring system for interactive fiction
Greg Nelson (1953–2015) – satisfiability modulo theories, extended static checking, program verification, Modula-3 committee, Simplify theorem prover in ESC/Java
Klára Dán von Neumann (1911–1963) – principal programmer for the MANIAC I
Maurice Nivat (1937–2017) – theoretical computer science, Theoretical Computer Science journal, ALGOL, IFIP WG 2.1 member
Phiwa Nkambule – cofounded Riovic, founded Cybatar
Peter Norton – programmed Norton Utilities
Kristen Nygaard (1926–2002) – Simula, object-oriented programming

O

Ed Oates – cocreated Oracle Database, cofounded Oracle Corporation
Martin Odersky – Scala
Peter O'Hearn – separation logic, bunched logic, Infer Static Analyzer
Jarkko Oikarinen – created Internet Relay Chat (IRC)
Andrew and Philip Oliver, the Oliver Twins – many ZX Spectrum games including Dizzy
John Ousterhout – created Tcl/Tk

P

Keith Packard – X Window System
Larry Page – cofounded Google, Inc.
Alexey Pajitnov – created game Tetris on Electronika 60
Seymour Papert – Logo (programming language)
David Park (1935–1990) – first Lisp implementation, expert in fairness, program schemas, bisimulation in concurrent computing
Mike Paterson – algorithms, analysis of algorithms (complexity)
Tim Paterson – authored 86-DOS (QDOS)
Markus Persson – created Minecraft
Jeffrey Peterson – key free and open-source software architect, created Quepasa
Charles Petzold – authored many Microsoft Windows programming books
Rob Pike – wrote first bitmapped window system for Unix, cocreated UTF-8 character encoding, authored text editor sam and programming environment acme, main author of Plan 9 and Inferno operating systems, and co-authored Go programming language
Kent Pitman – technical contributor to the ANSI Common Lisp standard
Tom Preston-Werner – cofounded GitHub

R

Theo de Raadt – founding member of NetBSD, founded OpenBSD and OpenSSH
Brian Randell – ALGOL 60, software fault tolerance, dependability, pre-1950 history of computing hardware
Jef Raskin – started the Macintosh project in Apple Computer, designed Canon Cat computer, developed Archy (The Humane Environment) program
Eric S. Raymond – Open Source movement, authored fetchmail
Hans Reiser – created ReiserFS file system
John Resig – creator and lead developed jQuery JavaScript library
Craig Reynolds – created boids computer graphics simulation
John C. Reynolds – continuations, definitional interpreters, defunctionalization, Forsythe, Gedanken language, intersection types, polymorphic lambda calculus, relational parametricity, separation logic, ALGOL
Reinder van de Riet – Editor: Europe of Data and Knowledge Engineering, COLOR-X event modeling language
Dennis Ritchie – C, Unix, Plan 9 from Bell Labs, Inferno
Ron Rivest – cocreated RSA algorithm (being the R in that name). created RC4 and MD5
John Romero – first-person shooters Doom, Quake
Blake Ross – co-authored Mozilla Firefox
Douglas T. Ross – Automatically Programmed Tools (APT), Computer-aided design, structured analysis and design technique, ALGOL X
Guido van Rossum – Python
Philip Rubin – articulatory synthesis (ASY), sinewave synthesis (SWS), and HADES signal processing system.
Jeff Rulifson – lead programmer on the NLS project
Rusty Russell – created iptables for linux
Steve Russell – first Lisp interpreter; original Spacewar! graphic video game
Mark Russinovich – Sysinternals.com, Filemon, Regmon, Process Explorer, TCPView and RootkitRevealer

S

Bob Sabiston – Rotoshop, interpolating rotoscope animation software
Muni Sakya – Nepalese software
Carl Sassenrath – Amiga, REBOL
Chris Sawyer – developed RollerCoaster Tycoon and the Transport Tycoon series
Cher Scarlett – Apple, Webflow, Blizzard Entertainment, World Wide Technology, and USA Today
Bob Scheifler – X Window System, Jini
Isai Scheinberg – IBM engineer, founded PokerStars
Bill Schelter – GNU Maxima, GNU Common Lisp
John Scholes – Direct functions
Randal L. Schwartz – Just another Perl hacker
Adi Shamir – cocreated RSA algorithm (being the S in that name)
Mike Shaver – founding member of Mozilla Organization
Cliff Shaw – Information Processing Language (IPL), the first AI language
Zed Shaw – wrote the Mongrel Web Server, for Ruby web applications
Emily Short – prolific writer of Interactive fiction and co-developed Inform version 7
Jacek Sieka – developed DC++ an open-source, peer-to-peer file-sharing client
Daniel Siewiorek – electronic design automation, reliability computing, context aware mobile computing, wearable computing, computer-aided design, rapid prototyping, fault tolerance
Ken Silverman – created Duke Nukem 3Ds graphics engine
Charles Simonyi – Hungarian notation, Bravo (the first WYSIWYG text editor), Microsoft Word
Colin Simpson – developed CircuitLogix simulation software
Rich Skrenta – cofounded DMOZ
David Canfield Smith – invented interface icons, programming by demonstration, developed graphical user interface, Xerox Star; Xerox PARC researcher, cofounded Dest Systems, Cognition
Matthew Smith – ZX Spectrum games, including Manic Miner and Jet Set Willy
Henry Spencer – C News, Regex
Joel Spolsky – cofounded Fog Creek Software and Stack Overflow
Quentin Stafford-Fraser – authored original VNC viewer, first Windows VNC server, client program for the first webcam
Richard Stallman – Emacs, GNU Compiler Collection (GCC), GDB, founder and pioneer of GNU Project, terminal-independent I/O pioneer on Incompatible Timesharing System (ITS), Lisp machine manual
Guy L. Steele Jr. – Common Lisp, Scheme, Java
Alexander Stepanov – created Standard Template Library
Christopher Strachey – draughts playing program
Ludvig Strigeus – created μTorrent, OpenTTD, ScummVM and the technology behind Spotify
Bjarne Stroustrup – created C++
Zeev Suraski – cocreated PHP language
Gerald Jay Sussman – Scheme
Herb Sutter – chair of ISO C++ standards committee and C++ expert
Gottfrid Svartholm – cocreated The Pirate Bay
Aaron Swartz – software developer, writer, Internet activist
Tim Sweeney – The Unreal engine, UnrealScript, ZZT

T

Amir Taaki – leading developer for Bitcoin project
Andrew Tanenbaum – Minix
Audrey "Autrijus" Tang – designed Pugs
Simon Tatham – Netwide Assembler (NASM), PuTTY
Larry Tesler – the Smalltalk code browser, debugger and object inspector, and (with Tim Mott) the Gypsy word processor
Jon Stephenson von Tetzchner – cocreated Opera web browser
Avie Tevanian – authored Mach kernel
Ken Thompson – mainly designed and authored Unix, Plan 9 and Inferno operating systems, B and Bon languages (precursors of C), created UTF-8 character encoding, introduced regular expressions in QED and co-authored Go language
Michael Tiemann – G++, GNU Compiler Collection (GCC)
Linus Torvalds – original author and current maintainer of Linux kernel and created Git, a source code management system
Andrew Tridgell – Samba, Rsync
Roy Trubshaw – MUD – together with Richard Bartle, created MUDs
Bob Truel – cofounded DMOZ
Alan Turing – mathematician, computer scientist and cryptanalyst
David Turner – SASL, Kent Recursive Calculator, Miranda, IFIP WG 2.1 member

V

Wietse Venema – Postfix, Security Administrator Tool for Analyzing Networks (SATAN), TCP Wrapper
Pat Villani – original author FreeDOS/DOS-C kernel, maintainer of a defunct Linux for Windows 9x distribution
Paul Vixie – BIND, Cron
Patrick Volkerding – original author and current maintainer of Slackware Linux Distribution

W

Eiiti Wada – ALGOL N, IFIP WG 2.1 member, Japanese Industrial Standards (JIS) X 0208, 0212, Happy Hacking Keyboard
John Walker – cofounded Autodesk
Larry Wall – Warp (1980s space-war game), rn, patch, Perl
Bob Wallace – author PC-Write word processor; considered shareware cocreator
Chris Wanstrath – cofounded GitHub
John Warnock – created PostScript
Robert Watson – FreeBSD network stack parallelism, TrustedBSD project and OpenBSM
Joseph Henry Wegstein – ALGOL 58, ALGOL 60, IFIP WG 2.1 member, data processing technical standards, fingerprint analysis
Pei-Yuan Wei – authored ViolaWWW, one of earliest graphical browsers
Peter J. Weinberger – cocreated AWK (being the W in that name)
Jim Weirich – created Rake, Builder, and RubyGems for Ruby; popular teacher and conference speaker
Joseph Weizenbaum – created ELIZA
David Wheeler – cocreated subroutine; designed WAKE; co-designed Tiny Encryption Algorithm, XTEA, Burrows–Wheeler transform
Molly White – HubSpot; creator of Web3 Is Going Just Great
Arthur Whitney – A+, K
why the lucky stiff – created libraries and writing for Ruby, including quirky, popular Why's (poignant) Guide to Ruby to teach programming
Adriaan van Wijngaarden – Dutch pioneer; ARRA, ALGOL, IFIP WG 2.1 member
Bruce Wilcox – created Computer Go, programmed NEMESIS Go Master
Evan Williams – created and cofounded language Logo
Roberta and Ken Williams – Sierra Entertainment, King's Quest, graphic adventure game
Sophie Wilson – designed instruction set for Acorn RISC Machine, authored BBC BASIC
Dave Winer – developed XML-RPC, Frontier scripting language
Niklaus Wirth – ALGOL W, IFIP WG 2.1 member, Pascal, Modula-2, Oberon
Stephen Wolfram – created Mathematica
Don Woods – INTERCAL, Colossal Cave Adventure
Philip Woodward – ambiguity function, sinc function, comb operator, rep operator, ALGOL 68-R
Steve Wozniak – Breakout, Apple Integer BASIC, cofounded Apple Inc.
Will Wright – created the Sim City series, cofounded Maxis
William Wulf – BLISS system programming language + optimizing compiler, Hydra operating system, Tartan Laboratories

Y

Jerry Yang – co-created Yahoo!
Victor Yngve – authored first string processing language, COMIT
Nobuo Yoneda – Yoneda lemma, Yoneda product, ALGOL, IFIP WG 2.1 member

Z

Matei Zaharia – created Apache Spark
Jamie Zawinski – Lucid Emacs, Netscape Navigator, Mozilla, XScreenSaver
Phil Zimmermann – created encryption software PGP, the ZRTP protocol, and Zfone
Mark Zuckerberg – created Facebook

See also
List of computer scientists
List of computing people
List of important publications in computer science
List of members of the National Academy of Sciences (computer and information sciences)
List of pioneers in computer science
List of programming language researchers
List of Russian programmers
List of video game industry people (programming)
!
Programmers
Computer Programmers